Daniel J. Lally (August 12, 1867 – April 14, 1936), was a Major League Baseball outfielder. He played for the 1891 Pittsburgh Pirates and 1897 St. Louis Browns of the National League. In addition to his two brief appearances in the Majors, he had an extensive minor league baseball career that lasted from 1887 through 1905.

After his playing career ended, he was an umpire in the South Atlantic League in 1907 and was later committed to the Wisconsin State Asylum after being declared insane in 1910.

Notes

External links

1867 births
1936 deaths
Major League Baseball outfielders
Baseball players from Jersey City, New Jersey
Pittsburgh Pirates players
St. Louis Browns (NL) players
19th-century baseball players
Boston Blues players
Toronto Canucks players
New Haven Nutmegs players
Memphis Giants players
Columbus Reds players
Erie Blackbirds players
Atlanta Windjammers players
Minneapolis Millers (baseball) players
Columbus Buckeyes (minor league) players
Columbus Senators players
St. Paul Apostles players
St. Paul Saints (Western League) players
Chicago White Stockings (minor league) players
Grand Rapids Furniture Makers players
Crookston Crooks players
Portland Browns players
Butte Miners players
Butte Fruit Pickers players
Charleston Sea Gulls players
Nashville Vols players